Karnajit Yumnam (born 27 December 1997) is an Indian cricketer. He made his List A debut on 28 September 2019, for Manipur in the 2019–20 Vijay Hazare Trophy. He made his Twenty20 debut on 11 January 2021, for Manipur in the 2020–21 Syed Mushtaq Ali Trophy.

References

External links
 

1997 births
Living people
Indian cricketers
Manipur cricketers
Place of birth missing (living people)